Knucklebones was a bi-monthly United States-based magazine, focused on providing news and reviews of board games and card games. The magazine included some puzzles and contests, typically with a game-oriented theme, and also included puzzles such as Sudoku and crosswords. Its headquarters was in Iola, Wisconsin.

Knucklebones won praise on the board game forum BoardGameGeek after they agreed to honour the subscriptions of former Games Quarterly Magazine subscribers.

Knucklebones was published by Jones Publishing.

References

External links
Knucklebones website at Internet Archive

2005 establishments in Wisconsin
2007 establishments in Wisconsin
Magazines published in the United States
Bimonthly magazines published in the United States
Defunct magazines published in the United States
Game magazines
Magazines established in 2005
Magazines disestablished in 2007
Magazines published in Wisconsin
Puzzle magazines